Trams in Sarajevo are a part of the public transport system in Sarajevo, the capital city of Bosnia and Herzegovina. The system is run by KJKP GRAS Sarajevo, which also operates trolleybus and bus routes in the city.

As of 2010, the Sarajevo tram system consists of seven lines, running along a single route with a -long branch to the city's main railway station (Željeznička Stanica). It primarily serves as an east-west link from the city centre (Baščaršija) to the western suburb of Ilidža.

History

Opened on New Year's Day in 1885, the Sarajevo tramway was the testing line for the tram in Vienna and the Austro-Hungarian Empire, and operated by horses. The trams played a pivotal role in the growth of the city in the 20th century.

During the Siege of Sarajevo of 1992-1995, trackwork and numerous vehicles were badly damaged. The tram operation stopped on April 15 1992, 9 days after the siege started, and resumed despite the dangers of the ongoing siege on April 15, 1994. The vehicles are once again operational though marks remain on some vehicles.

System

<noinclude>
The route lies on the main boulevard of Sarajevo, which is named (from west to east) first Bulevar Meše Selimovića (formerly 6 Proleterske Brigade), from Vila Čengić then Zmaj od Bosne (formerly Vojvode Radomira Putnika). From the district Marijin Dvor it runs a loop in a counter-clockwise direction along the Miljacka river on the street called Obala Kulina bana (formerly: Obala Vojvode Stepe Stepanovića). It proceeds to the terminus Baščaršija. The route then turns back towards Marijin Dvor on the northern parallel road Maršala Tita.

Six routes are presently in operation on the system, often only a specific section of the track. Only route 3 operates the entire length.
Route 1: Željeznička stanica – Baščaršija 
Route 2: Čengić Vila – Baščaršija 
Route 3: Ilidža – Baščaršija 
Route 4: Ilidža – Željeznička stanica 
Route 5: Nedžarići – Baščaršija 
Route 6: Ilidža – Skenderija
Route 7: Nedžarići – Skenderija (currently not running)

In the early 1990s, construction work started to expand the tram network from Nedžarići to Dobrinja, which was at the time served by a trolleybus system. Work stopped in 1992 when the siege started, which was also when most of the vehicles and infrastructure was damaged. At Nedžarići, it is possible to see tracks leading towards a planned, but never finished boulevard that would link towards Dobrinja. No work has been done in the said neighborhood to prepare access of trams there due to the start of the war, so these are the only traces of the planned extension.

Rolling stock 
In 1958, Sarajevo bought 50 relatively modern PCC-cars from Washington, renumbered in the 1-50 series. 21 more PCC-cars from Washington followed in 1962, numbered 51-71. These  71 PCC-cars were built between 1941 and 1944 by the St. Louis Car Company. Between 1967 and 1969, 20 of these streetcars were transformed into 10 articulated cars series 100-109.

The fleet in use on the network are Tatra K2 articulated trams from the Czech Republic, delivered in the 1970s and early 1980s. Later these trams have been joined by more modern vehicles in recent times. In 2008, Amsterdam donated 16 old trams to Sarajevo.

Gallery

See also

List of tram and light rail transit systems
Trams in Europe

References

Footnotes

Bibliography 
 Jan Čihák: Sarajevo Trams and Trolleybuses, bahnmedien.at, Vienna/Austria

External links
  KJKP GRAS d.o.o. Sarajevo
 Track plan of the Sarajevo tram system
 Virtualno Sarajevo - Sarajevo Trams
 Sarajevo public transport – Amazing tips to get around

Sarajevo
Transport in Sarajevo
Railway lines opened in 1885
760 mm gauge railways in Bosnia and Herzegovina
Sarajevo